Key Largo is a 1948 American film noir crime drama directed by John Huston and starring Humphrey Bogart, Edward G. Robinson and Lauren Bacall. The supporting cast features Lionel Barrymore and Claire Trevor. The film was adapted by Richard Brooks and Huston from Maxwell Anderson's 1939 play of the same name. Key Largo was the fourth and final film pairing of actors Bogart and Bacall, after To Have and Have Not (1944), The Big Sleep (1946), and Dark Passage (1947). Claire Trevor won the 1948 Best Supporting Actress Academy Award for her portrayal of alcoholic former nightclub singer Gaye Dawn.

Plot

Army veteran Frank McCloud arrives at the Hotel Largo in Key Largo, Florida, visiting the family of George Temple, a friend who served under him and was killed in the Italian campaign several years before. He meets with the friend's widow Nora Temple, and his father James, who owns the hotel. Because the winter vacation season has ended and a hurricane is approaching, the hotel has only six guests: dapper Toots, boorish Curly, stone-faced Ralph, servant Angel, attractive but aging alcoholic Gaye Dawn, and a sixth man who remains secluded in his room. The visitors claim to be in the Florida Keys for fishing.
	
Frank tells Nora and James about George's heroism under fire and shares some small and cherished details that George had spoken of. Nora and her father-in-law seem taken with Frank, stating that George frequently mentioned Frank in his letters.

While preparing the hotel for the hurricane, the three are interrupted by Sheriff Ben Wade and his deputy Sawyer. They are searching for the Osceola brothers, a pair of fugitive American Indians. Soon after the police leave, the local Seminoles seek shelter at the hotel, among them the Osceola brothers.

As the storm approaches, Curly, Ralph, Angel, and Toots pull guns and take the Temples and Frank hostage. They explain that the sixth, reclusive member of their party is notorious gangster Johnny Rocco, who was exiled to Cuba some years before. Rocco is waiting for his Miami contacts to arrive to conclude a deal. The gang discover Deputy Sawyer looking about and capture him. A tense standoff ensues. Frank declines to fight a duel with Rocco, stating his belief in self-preservation over heroics and that "one Rocco more or less isn't worth dying for”. Rocco shoots Sawyer, and Rocco's men take Sawyer's body out on a rowboat in the approaching storm to bury it at sea.

As the storm rages outside, Rocco forces his former moll, Gaye, to sing for them but then demeans her. In contrast, Frank politely gives her the promised drink and ignores Rocco's slaps. Nora understands that Frank's heroism matches her husband's, who was killed around Monte Cassino in Italy. Mr. Temple invites Frank to live with them at the hotel, a prospect that intrigues Nora.

The storm finally subsides. Sheriff Wade returns looking for Deputy Sawyer, and discovers his body washed up by the storm on the hotel driveway. Rocco goes outside and convinces the Sheriff that the Osceola brothers are responsible for Sawyer's death. Wade confronts and kills them both before leaving with Sawyer's body. Rocco's contact Ziggy arrives to buy a large amount of counterfeit money. Rocco then forces Frank, who is a skilled seaman, to take him and his henchmen back to Cuba on the small hotel boat. As the gang prepares to board the boat, Gaye steals Rocco's gun and covertly passes it to Frank.

Out on the Straits of Florida, Frank uses seamanship, trickery, and the stolen gun to kill the gang members one by one. He then heads back to Key Largo, while radioing for Coast Guard help and to get a message to the hotel. Meanwhile, Gaye tells Wade that Rocco bears the blame for Deputy Sawyer's murder.  Wade mentions that Ziggy's gang has been captured and leaves with Gaye to identify them.

The phone rings: James and Nora are delighted to hear that Frank is returning safely. Nora opens the shutters to the sun, while out at sea, Frank steers the boat towards shore.

Cast

In addition, Jay Silverheels and Rodd Redwing appear in uncredited roles as John and Tom Osceola, respectively.

Production
The script was adapted from a 1939 play of the same name by Maxwell Anderson. In the play, the gangsters are Mexican bandidos, the war in question is the Spanish Civil War, and McCloud is a disgraced deserter who dies at the end.

Robinson had top billing over Bogart in their four previous films together: Bullets or Ballots (1936), Kid Galahad (1937), The Amazing Dr. Clitterhouse (1938) and Brother Orchid (1940), but the situation switched for the billing in this final film in which Bogart and Robinson worked together. In at least one trailer for the film, however, Robinson is billed above Bogart in a list of the actors' names at the end of the preview, and photographs exist of Robinson being billed above Bogart on some theatre marquees. In the film itself and in posters, Robinson's name is between Bogart's and Bacall's but slightly higher than the other two. In some posters, Robinson's picture is substantially larger than Bogart's, and in the foreground manhandling Bacall while Bogart is in the background.

The film was shot primarily at the Warner Bros. Studios, Burbank, in order to keep costs down.  The beach and hotel exterior were constructed on the Warner Bros. backlot; the interior scenes were filmed on a sound stage; and the boat scenes were filmed in Sound Stage 21, a huge indoor water tank. Exterior shots of the hurricane were taken from stock footage used in Night Unto Night, a Ronald Reagan melodrama which Warner Bros. also produced in 1948. Filming took 78 days.

The boat used by Rocco's gang to depart Key Largo, with Bogart's character at the helm, is named the Santana, which was also the name of Bogart's personal 55-foot (17 m) sailing yacht.

Song
A high point of the film comes when Robinson's alcoholic former moll Gaye Dawn (Claire Trevor) is forced to sing a song a cappella before he will allow her to have a drink. Trevor was nervous about the scene and assumed that she would be lip-syncing to someone else's voice. She kept after director Huston to rehearse the song, but he put her off and said "there's plenty of time." One afternoon, he told her that they would shoot the scene right then, without any rehearsal. She was given her starting note from a piano, and then sang in front of the rest of the cast and the crew. It was this raw take that was used in the film. The song was "Moanin' Low," composed by Ralph Rainger with lyrics by Howard Dietz, introduced on Broadway in the 1929 revue The Little Show by Libby Holman. It became a hit and was Holman's signature song.

Author Philip Furia, whose books focus on the lyricists of the Tin Pan Alley era, writes that the song is about a woman who is trapped in a relationship with a cruel man, and Gaye slowly realizes as she is singing that she is in that very situation herself. He suggests that Trevor's performance in the role slowly breaks down during the song; "her voice falters and she sings off key." After the song, Bogart pours her a drink, saying "you deserve this." "It's a wonderful use of a song in a non-musical picture," according to Furia. He also suggests that Trevor won the Academy Award "based purely, I think, on that performance."

Box office
According to Warner Bros. records, the film earned $3,219,000 domestically and $1,150,000 foreign.

Awards and honors

Home media
MGM released the VHS format on February 11, 1997 while Warner Archive Collection released the Blu-ray version and DVD reissue on February 23, 2016 and May 8, 2018 respectively.

See also
 List of films featuring home invasions

References

External links

 
 
 
 
 
 Radio adaptation of the film by Lux Radio Theater, originally broadcast on November 28, 1949, and hosted at the Internet Archive

1940s crime thriller films
1948 films
1948 crime drama films
American black-and-white films
American crime drama films
American crime thriller films
American films based on plays
1940s English-language films
Film noir
Films about hostage takings
Films about veterans
Films based on works by American writers
Films directed by John Huston
Films featuring a Best Supporting Actress Academy Award-winning performance
Films produced by Jerry Wald
Films scored by Max Steiner
Films set in Florida
Films set in hotels
Films with screenplays by John Huston
American gangster films
Home invasions in film
Key Largo
Warner Bros. films
1940s American films